Limnichites is a genus of minute marsh-loving beetles in the family Limnichidae. There are about 15 described species in Limnichites.

Species
These 15 species belong to the genus Limnichites:

 Limnichites austinianus Casey
 Limnichites browni Wooldridge, 1977
 Limnichites confertus (Sharp, 1902)
 Limnichites densissimus Casey
 Limnichites foraminosus Casey, 1912
 Limnichites huronicus Casey, 1912
 Limnichites imparatus Wooldridge, 1977
 Limnichites nebulosus (LeConte, 1879)
 Limnichites olivaceus (LeConte, 1854)
 Limnichites perforatus (Casey, 1889)
 Limnichites porrectus Wooldridge, 1977
 Limnichites punctatus (LeConte, 1854)
 Limnichites rudis Wooldridge, 1977
 Limnichites simplex Wooldridge, 1977
 Limnichites virginicus Casey

References

Further reading

 

Byrrhoidea
Articles created by Qbugbot